Marumagal is a 1953 Indian Tamil-language drama film, produced by Lena Chettiar on Krishna Pictures banner and directed by D. Yoganand. The film stars N. T. Rama Rao, Padmini and Lalitha, with music composed by C. R. Subburaman. It was simultaneously shot in Telugu-language as Ammalakkalu.

Plot 
This is the plot of the Telugu version.

Ramaiah (B. R. Panthulu) & Kistaiah (D. Balasubramanyam) are close friends and farmers. Ramaiah's family consists of his wife Sugunamma (Rushyendramani) and two sons Sundar (Amarnath), Kumar (N. T. Rama Rao) and a daughter Rupa (Surabhi Balasaraswathi), who are struggling for their daily needs. On the guidance of Kishtaiah, Ramaiah starts a small contract business in the town for which Kistaiah organizes the amount by mortgaging his wife's jewelry. Right now, Ramaiah settles in the town, returns the debt and also promises to couple up Kishtaiah's daughter Usha (Padmini) with Kumar. Meanwhile, Ramaiah's sons move to town for education when this Ammalakkalu heckles at Usha which makes Kistaiah offended, so, he too joins Usha in the same school. Years roll by, Kumar & Usha grow up together and love each other. At present, Ramaiah arranges his elder son Sundar's marriage with a shrew woman Shanta (Lalitha). During the time of the wedding, Ammalakkalu provokes Sugunamma and she insults Kistaiah's wife when a rift arises between families. Here Kistaiah becomes furious leaves the venue and even breaks up the match of Usha & Kumar. So, they perform register marriage when soft-hearted Ramaiah welcomes the couple into the home. But Sugunamma & Shanta are very cold towards Usha. During that plight, Kumar leaves abroad for higher studies and Usha faces a lot of difficulties in her in-law's house. The rest of the story how she gets rid of these problems and reunited the family.

Cast 
N. T. Rama Rao as Kumar
Padmini as Usha
Lalitha as Shanta

 Tamil version

S. V. Sahasranamam
T. R. Ramachandran
B. R. Panthulu
M. Saroja
M. Lakshmiprabha
D. Balasubramaniam
S. D. Subbulakshmi
V. K. Ramasamy
Kallapart Natarajan
C. T. Rajakantham
K. S. Angamuthu
"Master" Sudhakar
"Surabhi" Balasaraswathi as Rupa
Indra Acharya
K. S. Adhilakshmi
V. Suryakantham
Baby Saraswathi
Dance
Ragini-Padmini-Kusalakumari

Telugu version
Relangi as Riyo
Amarnath as Sundar
Dr. Sivaramakrishnaiah as Achchaiah
B. R. Panthulu as Ramaiah
D. Balasubramanyam as Kishtaiah
Suryakantham as Seshamma
Rushyendramani as Sugunamma
Surabhi Kamalabai as Parvathi
Surabhi Balasaraswathi as Rupa

Soundtrack 
The music was composed by C. R. Subburaman with background music to be completed later by Viswanathan–Ramamoorthy and Party after the untimely death of C. R. Subburaman.T. K. Ramamoorthy acted as his assistant in several films and was asked by the producer to complete the music for the film. Tunes for both languagres are the same.

Tamil soundtrack
However, there was one song in the film "Aanukkoru Penn Pillai" that was composed by G. Ramanathan.
Lyrics by Udumalai Narayana Kavi & K. D. Santhanam. Singer is T. R. Ramachandran. Playback singers are A. M. Rajah, C. R. Subburaman, P. A. Periyanayaki, M. L. Vasanthakumari, Jikki, A. P. Komala & A. G. Rathnamala.

Telugu soundtrack
Playback singers are A. M. Rajah, Pithapuram Nageswara Rao, P. A. Periyanayaki, M. L. Vasanthakumari, Jikki, A. P. Komala & R. Balasaraswathi Devi.

Box office 
The film fared well at box office in both languages, but the Telugu version was more successful. In Ammalakkalu, the duet song sung by Relangi became popular in Telugu districts.

References

External links 
 
 

1953 films
1950s Tamil-language films
Films scored by Viswanathan–Ramamoorthy
Films scored by G. Ramanathan
Films scored by C. R. Subbaraman
Indian drama films
Indian multilingual films
Films directed by D. Yoganand
1953 directorial debut films
1953 drama films
Indian black-and-white films
1950s multilingual films